Puerto Cárdenas is a lakeside hamlet at the outflow of Yelcho Lake in Chaitén commune, southern Chile. Carretera Austral passes by the hamlet.  

Geography of Los Lagos Region
Populated places in Palena Province
Populated lakeshore places in Chile